Carlo Ginzburg (born April 15, 1939) is an Italian historian and proponent of the field of microhistory. He is best known for Il formaggio e i vermi (1976, English title: The Cheese and the Worms), which examined the beliefs of an Italian heretic, Menocchio, from Montereale Valcellina.

In 1966, he published The Night Battles, an examination of the benandanti visionary folk tradition found in sixteenth- and seventeenth-century Friuli in northeastern Italy.  He returned to looking at the visionary traditions of early modern Europe for his 1989 book Ecstasies: Deciphering the Witches' Sabbath.

Life 
The son of Natalia Ginzburg, a novelist, and Leone Ginzburg, a philologist, historian, and literary critic, Carlo Ginzburg was born in 1939 in Turin, Italy. His interest for history was influenced by the works of historians Delio Cantimori and Marc Bloch. He received a PhD from the University of Pisa in 1961. He subsequently held teaching positions at the University of Bologna, the University of California, Los Angeles (1988–2006), and the Scuola Normale Superiore di Pisa. His fields of interest range from the Italian Renaissance to early modern European history, with contributions to art history, literary studies, and the theory of historiography.

In 1979, Ginzburg formally requested that the former Pope John Paul II open the Inquisition Archives. While the immediate response of the Vatican has not yet come to light, a limited group of scholars had been granted access by 1991. In January 1998 the archives were formally opened to "qualified researchers." Cardinal Ratzinger (who later became Pope Benedict XVI) credited Ginzburg, and his 1979 letter, as having been instrumental in the Vatican's decision to open these archives. Ginzburg had his doubts about using statistics to reach a judgment about the period. “In many cases, we don’t have the evidence, the evidence has been lost,” said Ginzburg.

Along with Paul Ginsborg, Marcello Flores, Sergio Luzzatto, Claudio Pavone, Enzo Traverso, etc., Ginzburg called, in January 2002, for the rejection of a bill, presented by Justice Minister Clemente Mastella, that would have outlawed Holocaust denial. They argued that Italy's legislation was sufficient to cope with such acts. The amended bill finally restricted itself to reinforcing sentences concerning hate speech.

He was awarded the 2010 Balzan Prize and was elected an International Member of the American Philosophical Society in 2013.

Work 

In The Night Battles and Ecstasies, Ginzburg traced a complex path from certain European witch persecutions to the benandanti and a wide variety of practices which he describes as evidence of a substrate of shamanic cults in Europe. His 1999 work, The Judge and the Historian, sought to expose injustice in the trial of Adriano Sofri, but failed to win a new trial. His book was not only about Sofri, but was also a general reflection on the scientific methods used by a historian, and their similarity to the work of a judge, who also has to correlate testimonies with material evidence in order to deduce what really happened. Thus, he explains how the judicial model of early historiography made it focus on easily verifiable facts, resulting in studies that centered on individuals or on what Lucien Febvre and Marc Bloch called in the Annales d'histoire économique et sociale an "evenemential history". In his book History, Rhetoric, and Proof (1999), he contrasts  the ancient rhetoric of Aristotle with the modern rhetoric of Nietzsche.

Bibliography 
 (First published in Italian as Il formaggio e i vermi, 1976)
 (First published in Italian as I benandanti, 1966)

 (revised edition, 2000)

 (First published in Italian as Storia notturna: Una decifrazione del Sabba, 1989)

 (First published in Italian as Il giudice e la storico, 1991)

See also 
Leone Ginzburg (father), Natalia Ginzburg (mother)
Vatican Secret Archives
Menocchio, accused of heresy

References

External links 
 Ginzburg UCLA Homepage
Carlo Ginzburg at the International Balzan Prize Foundation
 On the Dark Side – Ginzburg interview

 “An Interview with Carlo Ginzburg by Yehuda Safran and Daniel Sherer,” Potlatch 5 (2022), 1-55.

20th-century Italian historians
Jewish historians
Microhistorians
1939 births
Living people
Jewish Italian writers
Viareggio Prize winners
Writers from Turin
20th-century Italian male writers
Italian people of Ukrainian-Jewish descent
Academic staff of the Scuola Normale Superiore di Pisa
Italian male non-fiction writers
20th-century Italian Jews
21st-century Italian historians